Los Aquijes District is one of fourteen districts of the province Ica in Peru.

References

1926 establishments in Peru